Charlotte Mensah is a British/Ghanaian hairstylist. She is the founder and creative director of Hair Lounge, on London's Portobello Road. In November 2018 she became the first black woman to be inducted into the British Hairdressing Hall of Fame.

Early life and education 
Mensah was born in the United Kingdom. She attended London College of Fashion.

Awards 
Some of the awards she has won for her work include:

 2012 - Weave Stylist of the Year and Hair Stylist of the Year at Beauty/Sensationnel Hair Awards
2013 - UK's best Afro Hairdresser of the Year at the British Hairdressing Awards
 2014 - UK's best Afro Hairdresser of the Year at the British Hairdressing Awards
 2017 - UK's best Afro Hairdresser of the Year at the British Hairdressing Awards

Philanthropy

Charlotte Mensah Academy 
She founded the Charlotte Mensah Academy, through which she organises workshops to train young, less fortunate individuals in Ghana her skill.

Ladies of Visionary Empowerment (LOVE) 
She also founded the Ladies of Visionary Empowerment which aims at furthering education opportunities and empowerment for young women in Africa.

References

Living people
British people of Ghanaian descent
British hairdressers
British women
Ghanaian businesspeople
British businesspeople
Year of birth missing (living people)